The 1936 United States presidential election in New York took place on November 3, 1936. All contemporary 48 states were part of the 1936 United States presidential election. Voters chose 47 electors to the Electoral College, which selected the president and vice president. New York was won by incumbent Democratic President Franklin D. Roosevelt of New York, who was running against Republican Governor of Kansas Alf Landon. Roosevelt ran with incumbent  Vice President John Nance Garner of Texas, and Landon ran with newspaper publisher Frank Knox of Illinois.

A former Governor of New York who had easily carried the state four years earlier, Franklin Roosevelt won New York State in 1936 by an even more decisive margin. Roosevelt took 58.85% of the vote versus Alf Landon's 38.97%, a margin of 19.88%. Despite being Roosevelt's home state, in the context of the 1936 nationwide Democratic landslide, New York weighed in for this election as 4% more Republican than the national average, although FDR won the state by nearly 20 points.

Roosevelt won his home state by means of a dominance of the massively populated New York City area, performing even more strongly than he had in 1932. Roosevelt took over 70% of the vote in the boroughs of Manhattan, Brooklyn and the Bronx, and took over 60% of the vote in Queens and Staten Island. For the era, this was an historically overwhelming victory for a Democratic presidential candidate in the five boroughs of New York City, and enough to easily secure a statewide win for Roosevelt. The emergence of the New Deal Coalition was at its peak in 1936, and made American cities with their powerful political machines core bases of support for the Democratic Party. The Great Depression had accelerated the process of urbanization of the Democratic Party which had begun with the election of 1928. Roosevelt's landslide win in New York City was a fruit born by this process, and over the whole nation he achieved majorities in the largest cities totaling twice what Harding had achieved in 1920. 1936 was the third election in a row in which Democrats had won all five boroughs of NYC. After 1936, New York City would remain Democratic overall in every election that has followed, although no presidential candidate would sweep all five boroughs of NYC again until Lyndon Johnson in 1964. Partly as a consequence of this, FDR's 1936 victory in New York State would also be the strongest statewide Democratic performance ever in terms of both margin and vote share until 1964.

In upstate New York, Roosevelt's support was mostly concentrated in the cities. Roosevelt again carried the state capital of Albany, which since 1928 had become a Democratic stronghold of a city. Nearby Schenectady and Montgomery counties went Democratic as well. 1936 also saw FDR flip Erie County into the Democratic column, home to the city of Buffalo in western New York, which up to that point was a Republican county that had even held for Herbert Hoover in 1932. Finally flipping in 1936, Buffalo has largely remained a loyal Democratic bastion ever since. Monroe County, home to the city of Rochester, also swung from voting for Hoover in 1932 to Roosevelt in 1936. Roosevelt's other wins in the state were pluralities in Rockland County and Sullivan County.

However, much of rural upstate New York remained one of the most loyally Republican regions in the nation throughout the FDR era, which many locals attributed to the fact that New Deal public works had barely affected these regions. Going against the trend of both the state and the nation, FDR lost Franklin County to Landon in northern New York, a county which FDR had won in 1932 and which was even won by Al Smith in 1928, leaving Clinton County as the sole Democratic win in the North Country region of the state in 1936. Roosevelt also lost Rensselaer County to Landon in the Capital District, despite Roosevelt having won Rensselaer in 1932 and Smith winning there in 1928. 

The rural Midwest, rural upstate New York and Unionist parts of Appalachia have been the consistent bastions of the Republican Party since the Civil War.

This was the last election in which Democrats won the boroughs of Queens until 1960 and Staten Island until 1964.

Results

Results by county

See also
 United States presidential elections in New York
 Presidency of Franklin D. Roosevelt

References

New York
1936
1936 New York (state) elections